Jacob "Jake" Martin (born December 11, 1995) is an American football outside linebacker for the Denver Broncos of the National Football League (NFL). He played college football at Temple. Martin was a second-team All-American Athletic Conference selection in 2017 and led the Owls in sacks with eight.

Professional career

Seattle Seahawks
Martin was drafted by the Seattle Seahawks in the sixth round (186th overall) of the 2018 NFL Draft.

Houston Texans

2019 season
On August 31, 2019, the Seahawks traded Martin along with outside linebacker Barkevious Mingo and a 2020 third-round pick to the Houston Texans in exchange for Jadeveon Clowney.
In week 9 against the Jacksonville Jaguars, Martin forced a fumble on Gardner Minshew that was recovered by teammate Zach Cunningham in the 26–3 win. In Week 12 against the Indianapolis Colts, Martin recorded his first sack as a Texan, bringing down Jacoby Brissett in the first quarter in the 20-17 win.
In the AFC wild card game against the Buffalo Bills, Martin sacked Josh Allen once and recovered a fumble forced by teammate Whitney Mercilus on Allen during the 22–19 overtime win.

2020 season
In Week 1 of the season against the Kansas City Chiefs, Martin recorded his first sack of the season on Patrick Mahomes during the 34–20 loss. Martin was placed on the reserve/COVID-19 list by the team on November 5, and activated on November 17.

2021 season 
In 2021 Martin played 17 games defended 3 passes and forced 2 fumbles. He also recorded a career best 4.0 sacks while contributing 23 total tackles with 5 for a loss with scoring the first safety of his career.

New York Jets

2022 season
On March 17, 2022, the New York Jets signed Martin to a three-year $16.5 million deal.

Denver Broncos
On November 1, 2022, Martin was traded along with a 2024 fifth-round pick to the Denver Broncos for a 2024 fourth-round pick. He was placed on injured reserve on December 14.

References

External links
Temple Owls bio

1995 births
Living people
American football defensive ends
American football linebackers
Denver Broncos players
Houston Texans players
Players of American football from Colorado
Seattle Seahawks players
Sportspeople from Aurora, Colorado
Temple Owls football players
New York Jets players